Barrington Belgrave (born 16 September 1980 in Bedford, England) is an English footballer, who plays for St Neots Town.

Belgrave made his debut for Southend United in a 0–0 draw with Hartlepool United on 15 September 2001.

External links

Career information at ex-canaries.co.uk

1980 births
Living people
Sportspeople from Bedford
English footballers
Association football forwards
Norwich City F.C. players
Plymouth Argyle F.C. players
Yeovil Town F.C. players
Southend United F.C. players
Farnborough F.C. players
Lewes F.C. players
Arlesey Town F.C. players
Bedford Town F.C. players
St Neots Town F.C. players
English Football League players
National League (English football) players
Footballers from Bedfordshire